Marc Leclair (born August 13, 1966), better known by his stage name Akufen, is a Canadian electronic musician. His music is electronic music that is often described as minimal house, minimal techno, glitch, or microhouse.

His 2002 release titled My Way introduced his concept of "microsampling", which was essentially a way of using extremely small and short clips of samples he had randomly recorded from FM radio broadcasts as a key musical element.

Leclair's pseudonym comes from the French word for tinnitus (ringing of the ears), acouphène, and he has also gone under the pseudonyms Horror Inc., David Scott, Nefuka, and Anna Kaufen.

Discography

As Akufen

 Quebec Nightclub (2001)
 My Way (2002)
 Hawaiian Wodka Party (2003)
 Fabric 17 (mix album) (2004)
 Blu TribunL (split with Freeform and The Rip-Off Artist) (2004) 
 Battlestar Galacticlown (2012)
 J Gabriel - Levity (Remixes)" 2020, Eyedyllic Music - https://www.traxsource.com/title/1336510/levity

As Marc Leclair
 Musique pour 3 Femmes Enceintes (2006)

As Horror Inc.
 Briefly Eternal'' (2013)

References

External links

Living people
Canadian techno musicians
Canadian house musicians
Ableton Live users
Musicians from Montreal
1966 births